Rinat Zaydulayevich Ayupov (born 13 August 1974, Astrakhan) is a Russian political figure, deputy of the 8th State Duma convocation. In 1996 he graduated from the Astrakhan State Technical University. From 2010 to 2011, he was a deputy of the City Duma of Astrakhan. In 2011-2021 he was a deputy of the Duma of Astrakhan Oblast of the 5th, 6th, and 7th convocations. He was also an entrepreneur and for 15 years served as the head of the largest logistics company in Astrakhan.

Since 19 September 2021 he has served as a deputy of the State Duma of 8th convocation. He ran with the United Russia to represent the Republic of Kalmykia and Astrakhan Oblast constituencies.

On 24 March 2022, the United States Treasury sanctioned him in response to the 2022 Russian invasion of Ukraine.

References

1974 births
Living people
People from Astrakhan
United Russia politicians
21st-century Russian politicians
Eighth convocation members of the State Duma (Russian Federation)
Russian individuals subject to the U.S. Department of the Treasury sanctions